There have been six baronetcies created for persons with the surname Brooke, one in the Baronetage of England, one in the Baronetage of Ireland and four in the Baronetage of the United Kingdom. As of 2015 four of the creations are extant, though one has been subsumed into a peerage.

The Brooke Baronetcy, of Norton Priory in the County of Chester, was created in the Baronetage of England on 12 December 1662 for Henry Brooke, a Colonel in the Parliamentary Army and Member of Parliament for Cheshire during the Commonwealth. He was succeeded by his son, Richard, the second Baronet. He was Sheriff of Cheshire in 1667. His son, Thomas, the third Baronet, was Sheriff of Cheshire from 1719 to 1720. He was succeeded by his grandson, Richard, the fourth Baronet. He served as Sheriff of Cheshire from 1752 to 1753. His son, Richard, the fifth Baronet, was Sheriff of Cheshire from 1787 to 1788. On his death, the title passed to his son, Richard, the sixth Baronet. He was Sheriff of Cheshire from 1817 to 1818. His eldest son, Richard, the seventh Baronet, was High Sheriff of Cheshire between 1869 and 1870. His grandson, Richard, the ninth Baronet (who succeeded his father), was High Sheriff of Worcestershire in 1931, a Deputy Lieutenant of the county and a member of the Worcestershire County Council. As of 2014, the title is held by his great-grandson, the twelfth Baronet, who succeeded his father in 2012.

Five other members of the family may also be mentioned. Richard Brooke (died 1569), great-grandfather of the first Baronet, purchased the Norton Priory estate and was Sheriff of Cheshire in 1563. Thomas Brooke (died 1622), a grandfather of the first Baronet, was Sheriff of Cheshire in 1592. Thomas Brooke (1816–1880), second son of the sixth Baronet, was a General in the British Army. His son, Alured de Vere Brooke (1841–1926), was a colonel in the Royal Engineers. Sarah, Lady Brooke - the spouse of Sir Christopher, the current holder - is better known as Sarah Montague, the well-known BBC radio, and occasionally television, journalist.

The Brooke Baronetcy, of Colebrooke in the County of Fermanagh, was created in the Baronetage of Ireland on 3 January 1764 for Arthur Brooke, who represented Fermanagh and Maryborough in the Irish House of Commons. He had no surviving male issue and the title became extinct in 1785. The baronetcy was revived in 1822 in favour of his nephew, Henry Brooke (see below). See also the Brooke Baronetcy of Summerton below.

The Brooke Baronetcy, of Colebrooke in the County of Fermanagh, was created in the Baronetage of the United Kingdom on 7 January 1822 for Henry Brooke. He was the nephew of the first Baronet of the 1764 creation. For more information on the 1822 creation of the baronetcy, see the Viscount Brookeborough. See also the Brooke Baronetcy of Summerton below.

The Brooke Baronetcy, of Armitage Bridge in Huddersfield the County of York, was created in the Baronetage of the United Kingdom on 4 August 1899 for Thomas Brooke, a Deputy Lieutenant and Justice of the Peace. He was the elder brother of the first Baronet of the 1919 creation (see below). Brooke had no surviving male issue and the title became extinct on his death in 1908.

The Brooke Baronetcy, of Summerton in Castleknock in the County of Dublin, was created in the Baronetage of the United Kingdom on 12 October 1903 for George Brooke, head of George F. Brooke and Son, wine merchants, and a Director and Governor of the Bank of Ireland. He was the grandson of George Frederick Brooke (1779–1865), younger brother of the first Baronet of the 1822 creation and nephew of the first Baronet of the 1764 creation (see above and the Viscount Brookeborough for earlier history of the family). As of 2014 the baronetcy is held by his great-grandson (the title having descended from father to son), the fourth Baronet, who succeeded in 1982.

John Brooke (1887–1974), sixth son of the first Baronet, was a captain in the Royal Navy.

The Brooke Baronetcy, of Almondbury in the West Riding of the County of York, was created in the Baronetage of the United Kingdom on 13 September 1919 for John Brooke, a Director of John Brooke & Sons, of Huddersfield, and a Justice of the Peace for the West Riding of Yorkshire and Ross-shire. He was the younger brother of the first Baronet of the 1899 creation (see above). He was succeeded by his eldest surviving son, Robert, the second Baronet. He was a Deputy Lieutenant of Ross and Cromarty. His eldest son, John, the third Baronet, was a justice of the peace and Deputy Lieutenant for Ross-shire. As of 2014, the title is held by his son, the fourth Baronet, who succeeded in 1983.

Brooke baronets, of Norton Priory (1662)

Sir Henry Brooke, 1st Baronet (–1664)
Sir Richard Brooke, 2nd Baronet (c. 1635–1710)
Sir Thomas Brooke, 3rd Baronet (c. 1664–1737)
Sir Richard Brooke, 4th Baronet (c. 1719–1781)
Sir Richard Brooke, 5th Baronet (c. 1753–1795)
Sir Richard Brooke, 6th Baronet (1785–1865)
Sir Richard Brooke, 7th Baronet (1814–1888) High Sheriff of Cheshire
Sir Richard Marcus Brooke, 8th Baronet (1850–1920)
Sir Richard Christopher Brooke, 9th Baronet (1888–1981)
Sir Richard Neville Brooke, 10th Baronet (1915–1997)
Sir (Richard) David Christopher Brooke, 11th Baronet (1938–2012)
Sir (Richard) Christopher Brooke, 12th Baronet (born 1966)

The heir presumptive is the present holder's brother Edward Marcus Brooke (born 1970).

Brooke baronets, of Colebrooke (1764)
Sir Arthur Brooke, 1st Baronet (died 1785)

Brooke baronets, of Colebrooke (1822)
see the Viscount Brookeborough

Brooke baronets, of Armitage Bridge (1899)
Sir Thomas Brooke, 1st Baronet (1830–1908)

Brooke baronets, of Summerton (1903)
Sir George Frederick Brooke, 1st Baronet (1849–1926)
Sir Francis Hugh Brooke, 2nd Baronet (1882–1954)
Sir George Cecil Francis Brooke, 3rd Baronet (1916–1982)
Sir Francis George Windham Brooke, 4th Baronet (born 1963).

The heir apparent is the present holder's only son George Francis Geoffrey Brooke (born 1991).

Brooke baronets, of Almondbury (1919)
Sir John Arthur Brooke, 1st Baronet (1844–1920) married 1873, Blanche, daughter of Major Charles Samuel Weston, of Morvich, Sutherland, and was father of:
Sir Robert Weston Brooke, 2nd Baronet (1885–1942) married 1909, Margery Jean, daughter of businessman Alexander Geddes, of Blairmore, Aberdeenshire (he being also great-great-grandfather of former British Prime Minister David Cameron), and was the father of:
Sir John Weston Brooke, 3rd Baronet (1911–1983) married firstly, in 1945, Rosemary, daughter of Percy Llewelyn Nevill (grandson of William Nevill, 4th Earl of Abergavenny), and was the father of:
Sir Alistair Weston Brooke, 4th Baronet (born 1947)

The heir presumptive is the present holder's brother Charles Weston Brooke (born 1951).
The heir presumptive's heir apparent is his son John Weston Brooke (born 1992).

See also
Baron Brooke
Brooks baronets
de Capell-Brooke baronets
Viscount Brookeborough

Notes

References 
Kidd, Charles, Williamson, David (editors). Debrett's Peerage and Baronetage (1990 edition). New York: St Martin's Press, 1990, 

Baronetcies in the Baronetage of England
Baronetcies in the Baronetage of the United Kingdom
Extinct baronetcies in the Baronetage of Ireland
Extinct baronetcies in the Baronetage of the United Kingdom
1662 establishments in England
1764 establishments in Ireland
1822 establishments in the United Kingdom